Harold A. 'Harry' Armitage (1901-1973) was a footballer who played professionally for Sheffield Wednesday, Bristol Rovers and Lincoln City.

Armitage started out playing for Hathersage, with whom he won the Sheffield Amateur League during the 1919–20 season, before joining Sheffield Wednesday in 1920. In two seasons with Wednesday he made just three League appearances, and he moved on to Bristol Rovers in May 1922.

Armitage was a regular in the Bristol Rovers defence during his four years at the club, playing in 122 League games during that period, and also playing cricket for Stapleton C.C. during the summer of 1923. In 1926 he joined Lincoln City for a year, before moving to Scarborough Town in 1927.

Sources

1901 births
1973 deaths
Footballers from Sheffield
English footballers
Association football defenders
English Football League players
Sheffield Wednesday F.C. players
Bristol Rovers F.C. players
Lincoln City F.C. players